Lenox Ron O'Dell Shuman (born 13 September 1973) is a Guyanese politician who has served as Deputy Speaker of the National Assembly of Guyana since 2 September 2020. He is also the founder and leader of the Liberty and Justice Party.

On 2 September 2020, Shuman became the first Indigenous-Guyanese to become Deputy Speaker of the National Assembly.

Background 
Shuman was born on 13 September 1973. His mother was of mixed race, and his father descended from a long line of Lokono chiefs. In 1990, the family emigrated to Canada. He graduated from Confederation College in business and obtained a pilot licence. Before entering the world of politics, Shuman was a Canadian citizen working as a pilot for Sunwing Airlines. In 2009, he married Amanda Van Herten.

In 2009, Shuman returned to Guyana, and was elected toshao (village chief) for St. Cuthbert's Mission in 2015. The same year, he was elected vice-chairman of the National Toshaos Council. In 2019, the courts ruled that members of the National Assembly had to have Guyanese citizenship only, therefore Shuman relinquished his Canadian citizenship, to form the Liberty and Justice Party and run for president in the March 2020 Guyanese general election.

References

External links 

 Parliament Profile

Living people
1973 births
Guyanese people of Arawak descent
20th-century Guyanese politicians
Members of the National Assembly (Guyana)
People from Demerara-Mahaica